A Time Lord is a member of a fictional extraterrestrial species in the BBC TV series Doctor Who

Time Lord  may also refer to:

In gaming:
Time Lord (role-playing game), a roleplaying game by Virgin Publishing based on Doctor Who
Timelords (role-playing game), a roleplaying game by Blacksburg Tactical Research Center, unrelated to Doctor Who
Time Lord (video game), a video game for the Nintendo Entertainment System
Time lords, a series of cards in the Yu-Gi-Oh! Trading Card Game
The Time Lord, a fictional character from the Ultima series of computer games
 Time Lord, the title character in the Magnavox Odyssey²'s "Attack of the Time Lord" video game
In fiction:
Time Lords, a class of fictional characters featured in the 2003 TV series Teenage Mutant Ninja Turtles
The Time Lord, a one-off villain from The Super Globetrotters animated cartoon

In music:

The Timelords, the name under which the musical group The KLF released "Doctorin' the Tardis"
Timelord, an album by Momus

In sports:

Robert Williams III, an American professional basketball player who has been commonly referred to by the nickname "Time Lord"
In science:

 "Time Lords" is sometimes used as a nickname for the International Earth Rotation and Reference Systems Service

See also
Time Lord: Sir Sandford Fleming and the creation of standard time, a 2000 book by Clark Blaise about Sandford Fleming's creation of the time zone system
The Lord of Time, a fictional opponent of the Justice League of America, also known as Epoch
 Caliborn, a character in Homestuck who is known as the "Lord of Time".